The 1970 World Fencing Championships were held in Ankara, Turkey.

Medal table

Medal summary

Men's events

Women's events

References

FIE Results

World Fencing Championships
World Fencing Championships, 1970
Sports competitions in Ankara
1970s in Ankara
International fencing competitions hosted by Turkey
1970 in fencing